Patak-e Beygdeli (also Romanized as Patak-e Beygdelī; also known as Patak Beykdelī, Patak-e Begdelī, and Patik Bagdolli) is a village in Saroleh Rural District, Meydavud District, Bagh-e Malek County, Khuzestan Province, Iran. At the 2006 census, its population was 949, in 180 families.

References 

Populated places in Bagh-e Malek County